Miss World Ecuador 2018, the 6th edition of the Miss World Ecuador was held on June 13, 2018 in Guayaquil, Ecuador. Romina Zeballos from Guayas crowned Nicol Ocles as her successor, Miss World Ecuador 2018. She competed at Miss World 2018.The contest was directed by Tahíz Panús, and Julián Pico was the general producer. The 1st Runner-up, Carla Prado from Guayas was selected to compete at Miss Supranational 2018.

Results

Placements

International Representation

Fast Track

Fast Track Results

Miss Top Model

Miss Sports

Miss Beach Beauty

Best in Dances of Ecuador

Miss Head to Head Challenge

Miss Beauty With a Purpose

Contestants

Notes

Returns

Last compete in:

2013 
  Cañar
 Imbabura

2015 
  Loja
  Santo Domingo

Withdrawals

 Chimborazo
 Galápagos
 Orellana
 Pastaza

Replacements

  Loja - Andrea Burneo
 Santa Elena - Sheyla Tello

Crossovers

Betsabeth Heredia competed at Reina de Cuenca 2017, but she was unplaced.
Carla Prado competed at Miss Ecuador 2014 where she was 2nd Runner-up, giving her the right to compete at Miss International 2014, but she was unplaced.
Nayeli García was Virreina de La Libertad 2018 (2nd place).
Stephany Sánchez was Virreina de Santo Domingo 2017 (2nd place. Also, she won Reina Mundial del Banano Ecuador 2017 and competed at Reina Mundial del Banano 2017 where she finished 1st Runner-up (3rd place).

References

Beauty pageants in Ecuador
2018
2018 beauty pageants